Phassus pharus is a moth of the family Hepialidae first described by Herbert Druce in 1887. It is known from Guatemala. Food plants for this species include Malvaceae and grasses such as sugar cane.

References

External links
Grehan, John R. "Hepialidae: Phassus Walker, 1856". Hepialidae (Ghost Moths) and Other Exoporia of the World. With images of Phassus pharus.

Moths described in 1887
Hepialidae